Claire Windsor (born Clara Viola Cronk; April 14, 1892 – October 24, 1972) was an American film actress of the silent screen era.

Early life
Windsor was born Clara Viola Cronk (nicknamed "Ola") in 1892 in Marvin, Phillips County, Kansas to parents of Scandinavian descent, George Edwin Cronk and Ella Rose Fearing (later called "Rosella"), who married on October 21, 1885 in Davenport, Iowa. Their first child, a son, died shortly after birth. Her parents later moved to Cawker City, Kansas when she was two years old. At some point, Claire's sister, Nellie, was born. Claire attended Washburn Preparatory Academy in Topeka from 1906-07. After a year at Broadway High School, Seattle, Washington, she returned as a student in the Fine Arts Department at Washburn College. 

Intent on further refining her daughters' education and position in society, Rosella and her daughters returned to Seattle in the fall of 1910. On July 14, 1913, Claire ("Ola") was chosen for the role of Empress during the lavish musical production of Jappyland. While living in Seattle, Ola met David Willis Bowes and the intense relationship continued by correspondence after Mr. Bowes' return to Denver. Soon a June wedding was planned, but en route back to Kansas, Ola and Bowes wed secretly on May 13, 1914, in Denver, Colorado. The union resulted in the birth of a son, David Willis Bowes Jr., on September 9, 1916, but the couple soon went their separate ways. Bowes officially filed for divorce on September 14, 1920. 

Ola moved to California to be reunited with her parents who had recently retired. Seeking a way to support herself and baby son, Ola took the advice of a friend and quickly found employment at the movie studios. Initially receiving only bit parts, she was soon spotted by Lois Weber, a highly regarded and influential director and producer of silent films for Paramount Pictures. Weber immediately signed Windsor to a contract.

Career climb

Claire Windsor's film debut was in the 1920 release of Lois Weber's To Please One Woman which was only a modest success. To promote the nascent starlet, Paramount Pictures often paired Windsor with the newly divorced actor Charlie Chaplin in publicity photographs, leading the tabloid press to give mention to the young actress in print. In 1921, Windsor costarred with Louis Calhern in Weber's The Blot (1921). 

The publicity paid off; in 1922 the newly formed Western Association of Motion Picture Advertisers (WAMPAS) began their annual WAMPAS Baby Stars awards and she was named, along with Bessie Love, Lila Lee, Mary Philbin and Colleen Moore, as the year's most promising starlets. That same year Claire signed a contract with Goldwyn Pictures Corporation. She would appear in Broken Chains with fellow WAMPAS Baby Star Colleen Moore.

In 1923, the former Ola Cronk officially began using the more matinee-friendly Claire Windsor as a moniker. Throughout the 1920s, Windsor established herself as highly regarded leading lady in film. As her career progressed, she was often typecast as the "upscale society girl", often playing the part of a princess, or monied socialite. Critics lauded her elegant fashion sense, and Windsor became a noted trend-setter of 1920s fashion.

In 1924, Windsor was one of the top stars at the newly formed Metro-Goldwyn-Mayer studio. Later, at Tiffany Pictures, Souls for Sables (1925), co-starring Eugene O'Brien, was a box-office hit for Windsor.

Personal life and sound films 
Windsor was frequently romantically linked to her leading male co-stars. She reportedly had a well-publicized affair with actor Charles "Buddy" Rogers, and in 1925 married matinée idol Bert Lytell. The couple divorced in 1927, however. Windsor never remarried, but a few notable love affairs with men caused minor scandals in the press, including once being sued by the young wife of a Boston broker in an "Alienation of Affection" lawsuit, in which the broker's wife contended that Windsor had "stolen her husband".

By the late 1920s, Claire  (like so many of her acting peers) found it difficult to move into talkies. She made several talkies throughout the 1930s but could never recapture the success of her earlier years as a silent screen actress. She had a brief stint on a road tour with Al Jolson in the production of The Wonder Bar and occasionally took stage parts. In her later years, Windsor devoted herself to painting.

On April 12, 1943, she legally changed her name to Claire Windsor, and her son took the name of William Willis Windsor.

Death
Claire Windsor died of a heart attack on October 24, 1972, at the age of 80 at Good Samaritan Hospital, Los Angeles, California. (Windsor's age at death was reported as 74 in Sidney D. Kirkpatrick's 1986 book Cast of Killers.) She was buried at Glendale's Forest Lawn Memorial Park cemetery.

For her contribution to the motion picture industry, Claire Windsor was given a star on the Hollywood Walk of Fame at 7021 Hollywood Blvd. in Hollywood, California on February 8, 1960.

Filmography

Eyes of Youth (1919)
In the Heart of a Fool (1920)
To Please One Woman (1920)
What's Worth While? (1921)
Too Wise Wives (1921)
The Blot (1921)
What Do Men Want? (1921)
 Dr. Jim (1921)
The Raiders (1921)
Grand Larceny (1922)
 One Clear Call (1922)
Fools First (1922)
 Rich Men's Wives (1922)
Brothers Under the Skin (1922)
 The Strangers' Banquet (1922)
Broken Chains (1922)
The Eternal Three (1923)
Little Church Around the Corner (1923)
Rupert of Hentzau (1923)
The Acquittal (1923)
Nellie, The Beautiful Cloak Model (1924)
A Son of the Sahara (1924)
For Sale (1924)
Souls For Sale (1924)
The Dixie Handicap (1924)
Born Rich (1924)
The Denial (1925)
The White Desert (1925)
Just A Woman (1925)
The Lady Who Lied (1925)
Souls for Sables (1925)
Dance Madness (1926)
Money Talks (1926)
Tin Hats (1926)
A Little Journey (1927)
The Claw (1927)
The Bugle Call (1927)
Foreign Devils (1927)
The Frontiersman (1927)
 The Opening Night (1927)
Nameless Men (1928)
 Fashion Madness (1928)
 Satan and the Woman (1928)
Blondes by Choice (1928)
The Grain of Dust (1928)
Opening Night (1928)
 Domestic Meddlers (1928)
Captain Lash (1929)
 Midstream (1929)
Self Defense (1932)
 Sister to Judas (1932)
The Constant Woman (1933)
Kiss of Araby (1933)
Cross Streets (1934)
Kiss of Araby (1938)
Barefoot Boy (1938)
How Doooo You Do!!! (1945)

References

Sources
 1900 United States Census for Cawker, Mitchell County, Kansas, and 1910 United States Census for Kansas for Cawker, Mitchell County, Kansas
 Massillon Evening Independent, "Actress Asks To Keep Stage Name", April 12, 1943, p. 12.
 Philadelphia Inquirer, "Claire Windsor and Husband Former Denver Residents", February 2, 1922.

External links

Silent Era People - Claire Windsor
Silent Ladies & Gents - Claire Windsor Gallery
Classic Images - Claire Windsor

Photographs and literature

1892 births
1972 deaths
Actresses from Kansas
American film actresses
American silent film actresses
People from Mitchell County, Kansas
People from Phillips County, Kansas
American people of Scandinavian descent
Metro-Goldwyn-Mayer contract players
20th-century American actresses
Burials at Forest Lawn Memorial Park (Glendale)
WAMPAS Baby Stars